Sanchai and Sonchat Ratiwatana were the defending champions but chose not to defend their title.

Hsieh Cheng-peng and Rameez Junaid won the title after defeating Denys Molchanov and Igor Zelenay 7–6(7–3), 6–3 in the final.

Seeds

Draw

References
 Main Draw

Pingshan Open - Men's Doubles
Pingshan Open